Daphne Clair de Jong, née Williams (born 1939 in Dargaville, Northland) is a popular New Zealand writer of over 75 romance novels since 1977 as Daphne Clair and Daphne de Jong, and under the pseudonyms Laurey Bright, Clair Lorel, and Clarissa Garland, and she also publishes poetry and articles.

Daphne Clair de Jong was a founding member and first president of Feminists for Life New Zealand, and wrote articles articulating its position in the seventies. Feminists for Life had no policies on homosexuality/lesbianism or divorce, as stated in the constitution. She subsequently resigned from the organisation, which had increasingly become associated with social conservatism and conservative Christianity and later became Women for Life, dropping its feminist focus.

Biography
Daphne Clair Williams was born on 1939 in Dargaville, Northland, New Zealand. She decided to be a writer when she was 8 years old. She published her first short story when she was 16. She writes romantic novels, poetry and articles. She conducts a romance writing workshop for aspiring writers with Robyn Donald and offers her home as a writers' retreat. She has won awards for both her romantic novels and other works.

Clair is married to a Netherlands-born man, they have five children and live in the winterless north of New Zealand.

Bibliography

As Daphne Clair

Single novels
 Return to Love (1977)
 Streak of Gold (1978)
 My Darling Clementina (1978)
 Jade Girl (1978)
 Jasmine Bride (1979)
 The Sleeping Fire (1979)
 Something Less Than Love (1979)
 A Wilder Shore (1980)
 Darling Deceiver (1980)
 Frozen Heart (1980)
 Loving Trap (1980)
 Never Count Tomorrow (1980)
 Dark Remembrance (1981)
 Promise to Pay (1981)
 Pacific Pretence (1982)
 Marriage under fire (1983)
 A Ruling Passion (1983)
 Take Hold of Tomorrow (1984)
 Dark Dream (1985)
 No Escape (1987)
 No Winner (1987)
 The Wayward Bride (1989)
 Flame on the Horizon (1993)
 Dark Mirror (1994)
 Infamous Bargain (1994)
 Edge of Deception (1995)
 Wilde Man (1996)
 Grounds for Marriage (1996)
 Wilde Heart (1996)
 Lover's Lies (1997)
 Reckless Engagement (1997)
 Carpenter's Mermaid (1997)
 Summer Seduction (1998)
 Wife to a Stranger (1998)
 Makeshift Marriage (1999)
 His Trophy Mistress (2001)
 The Marriage Debt (2002)
 Claiming His Bride (2003)
 The Determined Virgin (2003)
 The Brunellesci Baby (2004)

Year Down Under series (multi-author)
 And Then Came Morning (1992)

Expecting! series (multi-author)
 The Riccioni Pregnancy (2003)

Omnibus in collaboration
 The Jasmine Bride / Sweet Promise / Turbulent Covenant (1987) (with Janet Dailey and Jessica Steele)
 The Tycoon's Virgin (2007) (with Sandra Field and Cathy Williams)

Nonfiction
 Writing Romantic Fiction (1999) (with Robyn Donald)

As Laurey Bright

Single novels
 Tears of Morning (1981)
 Sweet Vengeance (1982)
 Deep Waters (1983)
 When Morning Comes (1984)
 Fetters of the Past (1984)
 Long Way from Home (1985)
 Rainbow Way (1987)
 Jacinth (1988)
 Sudden Sunlight (1989)
 Games of Chance (1989)
 A Guilty Passion (1990)
 The Older Man (1992)
 The Kindness of Strangers (1993)
 An Interrupted Marriage (1994)
 A Perfect Marriage (1995)
 Summer's Past (1996)
 The Wedding Ultimatum (2001)
 Shadowing Shahna (2002)
 Life with Riley (2002)
 With His Kiss (2003)
 Dangerous Waters (2003)
 Her Passionate Protector (2004)
 Wed in White (2007)

Conveniently Wed series (multi-author)
 The Mother of His Child (1999)

Virgin Brides series (multi-author)
 Marrying Marcus (2001)
 The Heiress Bride (2002)

Omnibus in collaboration
 Her Passionate Protector / Wanted (2004) (with Ruth Langan)
 Shadowing Shahna / Millionaire for Molly (2004) (with Marion Lennox)

As Claire Lorel

Single novels
 Lord Brandsley's Bride (1981)
 Miss Miranda's Marriage (1982)
 Huntersford (1999)

As Daphne de Jong
 Crossing the Bar (1998)
 Gather the Wind (1999)

Omnibus in collaboration
 Venus, Vagabonds and Miscellanea (1993) (with Ann Macrae and Anna Granger)

As Clarissa Garland

Single novel
 Return to Opal Reach (1998)

Awards
 Dying Light: Katherine Mansfield Memorial Award and others
 1985 Lilian Ida Smith Award (non-fiction)

References and resources
 Daphne Clair de Jong's Official Website
 Daphne Clair at Mills & Boon

References

External links
 Daphne Clair and Laury Bright at Fantastic Fiction

20th-century New Zealand novelists
21st-century New Zealand novelists
New Zealand anti-abortion activists
New Zealand romantic fiction writers
New Zealand women novelists
1939 births
Living people
Women romantic fiction writers
21st-century New Zealand women writers
20th-century New Zealand women writers
People from Dargaville